Crazy From the Heart is the twelfth studio album by American country music duo The Bellamy Brothers. It was released in 1987 via MCA and Curb Records. The album includes the singles "Crazy from the Heart", "Santa Fe" and "I'll Give You All My Love Tonight".

Track listing

Personnel
Adapted from liner notes.

The Bellamy Brothers
David Bellamy - lead vocals
Howard Bellamy - harmony vocals

Musicians
Matt Betton - drums
Billy Crain - electric guitar
Charlie Daniels - harmony vocals
Wally Dentz - harmonica
David Hungate - bass guitar
John Barlow Jarvis - DX-7, piano
Mike Lawler - synthesizer
Patty Loveless - harmony vocals
George Terry - acoustic guitar, electric guitar
Billy Joe Walker Jr. - acoustic guitar
Reggie Young - electric guitar

Chart performance

References

1987 albums
The Bellamy Brothers albums
Albums produced by Emory Gordy Jr.
MCA Records albums
Curb Records albums